Wings of the Morning is the seventh studio album by Bryn Haworth.

Track listing

 "Give Thanks (Psalm 33)"
 "Lord I Love Your Word"
 "Were You There"
 "Let Us Humbly Worship Jesus"
 "Make Us Holy"
 "Awake O Zion"
 "I Found A Love"
 "We Give Thanks"
 "More Than A Tent"
 "He Is Lord"
 "Strong Wall"
 "What Kind Of Love Is This"

Personnel

Musicians
 Bryn Haworth - guitar, vocals
 Henry Spinetti - drums
 Dave Markee - bass
 Pete Wingfield - piano, keyboards
 Fran Byrne - drums
 Terry "Tex" Comer - bass
 Bam King - rhythm guitar
 Steve Gregory - saxophone

Production
 Produced - Bryn Haworth
 Engineered - Paul Cobbold, Dave Charles and Rob Andrews
 Mixed - Paul Cobbold
 Front cover painting  - Robin Clifton
 Photography - Tony Neeves

References

External links
 Bryn Haworth – Wings Of The Morning at discogs.com

1984 albums
Bryn Haworth albums